DWNX (91.1 FM) RMN Naga is a radio station owned and operated by the Radio Mindanao Network. The station's studio and transmitter are located at the RMN Broadcast Center, Maharlika Highway, Brgy. Del Rosario, Milaor.

History
DWNX was inaugurated on February 14, 1992 with the CHR format with the slogan NXFM, the Naga's FM station. On August 16, 1992, the station was rebranded as Smile Radio, with a mass-based format. On June 1, 1996, it was relaunched with an AM on FM format, this time using the RMN branding. At that time, the station's reformat was initially criticized by some listeners; some said that the change become radical, and it took some time to suit the taste of the listeners. It eventually went on to become the number 1 radio station in that format in Bicol. In 2017, DWNX opened a relay station on 1611 AM to serve areas outside Bicol region. There were plans for DWNX to transfer its broadcast to AM and launch iFM on its current frequency. However, due to consistent success of the station, the plan was shelved. On May 25, 2022, DWNX changed its new frequency to 1296 AM, from the former 1611 AM.

References

Radio stations in Naga, Camarines Sur
Radio stations established in 1992
News and talk radio stations in the Philippines